Noelle Hope Freeman (born August 16, 1989) is an American entrepreneur and founder of The DMS Agency.

Early life and education 
Freeman was born in San Diego County, California on August 16, 1989. She graduated from Carlsbad High School and is an alumna of Chapman University with a degrees in Advertising/Public Relations and Communication Studies. She was an active member of Delta Gamma sorority and served as the President in 2010.

Pageantry 
Freeman began competing in pageants at the age of 16, winning the title of San Diego's Junior Miss (now known as San Diego's Distinguished Young Women). Freeman went on to become Miss Teenage California 2007, Miss City of Orange 2009, Miss Culver City 2011, and Miss California 2011. She competed in the Miss America 2012 pageant where she placed 5th among all contestants.

Miss California 2011 
In February 2011, Freeman won the local Miss Culver City title. She competed in the Miss California pageant in June 2011, and was crowned Miss California. For her state talent, she performed The Black Swan ballet variation.

References

External links
 
 

Female models from California
Living people
Miss America 2012 delegates
People from Carlsbad, California
Chapman University alumni
1989 births